Amphicnaeia bivittata is a species of beetle in the family Cerambycidae. It was described by Melzer in 1933.

References

bivittata
Beetles described in 1933